"Bean (Kobe)" is a song by American rapper Lil Uzi Vert featuring fellow American rapper Chief Keef. Produced by Pi'erre Bourne, it was released on March 13, 2020, as the third track off of the deluxe edition of Uzi's album Eternal Atake, titled Lil Uzi Vert vs. The World 2. The track peaked at number 19 on the Billboard Hot 100.

Background 
Snippets of the track leaked in 2017 under the name "Kobe Rollie". Lil Uzi Vert and Chief Keef performed the song live in December 2018.

Music video 
The lyric video for the track was released on April 21, 2020.

Critical reception
Mehan Jayasuriya of Pitchfork called the track a "crown jewel" on the album, and said that the "woozy song zeroes in on the sweet spot between Keef's hard-charging flows and Uzi's impressionistic yelps". Andre Gee of Uproxx called the track a "highlight" on the album, and said that Chief Keef contributed "a surprisingly lucid verse that steadily picks up steam line-by-line".

Commercial performance 
The track debuted and peaked at number 19 on the Billboard Hot 100. The track was Chief Keef's first Hot 100 entry since his 2012 single "Love Sosa". It is also currently his highest-charting song.

Charts

References 

2020 songs
Lil Uzi Vert songs
Chief Keef songs
Songs written by Lil Uzi Vert
Songs written by Pi'erre Bourne
Songs written by Chief Keef